"Change His Ways" is a song by English vocalist Robert Palmer, which was released in 1989 as the fifth single from his ninth studio album Heavy Nova. The song was written and produced by Palmer. "Change His Ways" reached No. 28 in the UK.

A music video, featuring the use of animation and cartoon characters designed by the Italian artist and cartoonist Massimo Mattioli, was filmed to promote the single. The video parodies the highly successful Terence Donovan-directed videos for "Addicted to Love", "I Didn't Mean to Turn You On" and "Simply Irresistible" by replacing the backing models with caricature animated birds. The song itself features yodelling and Zydeco accordion.

Release
"Change His Ways" was released by EMI on 7" vinyl in the UK, Europe and Australasia. 12" vinyl and CD formats were issued in the UK and Europe, while a limited edition 7" picture disc was released in the UK. All 7" editions featured the B-side "More Than Ever", which also appeared on Heavy Nova.

Critical reception
Upon release, People commented on the song: "It starts out with a South African tinge then drifts through a reggae mood, a Louisiana riff or two, some mundane pop and, saints preserve, a snatch of yodeling. This is one of those notions that reads better than it sounds, and it doesn't read all that amusingly".

Track listing
7" single
"Change His Ways" – 2:57
"More Than Ever" – 3:25

12" single
"Change His Ways (Wed 9PM Mix)" – 5:16
"More Than Ever" – 3:25
"Change His Ways (Rock Mix)" – 4:51

CD single
"Change His Ways" – 2:57
"Change His Ways (Wed 9PM Mix)" – 5:16
"More Than Ever" – 3:25
"She Makes My Day" – 4:23

Chart performance

Personnel
 Robert Palmer – vocals, producer
 Eric "E.T." Thorngren – mixing
 Film Quarters – sleeve design
 Kevin Davies – photography
 Massimo Mattidi – sleeve artwork (origination of characterisation)

References

1988 songs
1989 singles
EMI Records singles
Robert Palmer (singer) songs
Songs written by Robert Palmer (singer)